The following is an incomplete list of association footballers who died during their playing careers.

Association football players who died on the pitch or from pitch related incidents
Following an increase in deaths, both during matches and training, in 2007 the International Federation of Association Football (FIFA) considered mandatory cardiac testing, already in place for years in some countries, such as Italy.

By 2009, FIFA pre-competition medical assessment included family history, heart rhythm, sounds, and electrocardiogram (ECG) results. The Union of European Football Associations (UEFA) required extensive medical tests, including ECG and echocardiogram for players in the Europa League 2011–12. Constant monitoring has been advised.

FIFA Sudden Death Report
To further understand the scale of the problem, a study, named the FIFA Sudden Death Report (FIFA-SDR), was commissioned by FIFA and carried out by Saarland University. It was published in 2020. The report recorded worldwide deaths attributed to sudden cardiac arrest or other unexplained sudden death while playing (or shortly after playing) football during the period from 2014 to 2018. There were 617 cases during the five-year period. In the majority of cases where an autopsy was carried out, the cause of death was coronary heart disease.

List of players who died
This is a selected list of examples that were reported in the media of football players that died because of various reasons, such as injuries, cardiac arrest, natural death and sometimes unknown reasons.

Transportation accidents

Plane crashes

Road & train accidents

Illnesses and other accidents

See also
 Sudden cardiac death of athletes
 Sudden arrhythmic death syndrome

References

External links
 Football deaths at Spartacus Educational - Details of several footballers' deaths up to 1936.

 
Association football players who died while playing
Died while playing
Association football
Association football player non-biographical articles